The European Para-Badminton Championships is a tournament organized by the Para Badminton World Federation (PBWF) which has now merged with the BWF. This tournament is hosted to crown the best para-badminton players in Europe.

The inaugural edition of the tournament was hosted in Stoke Mandeville, England in 1995.

Championships

Individual championships 
The table below states all the host cities (and their countries) of the European Championships.

All-time medal table

Past winners

2006 La Rinconada

2012 Dortmund

2014 Murcia

2016 Beek

2018 Rodez

See also 

 European Badminton Championships
 European Junior Badminton Championships

References 

 
Badminton
Europe